New Horizon is the eleventh studio album by American soul musician Isaac Hayes. The album was released in 1977, by Polydor Records. The album debuted at number 78 on the Billboard 200.

Track listing
All tracks composed by Isaac Hayes; except where indicated

References

1977 albums
Isaac Hayes albums
albums produced by Isaac Hayes
Polydor Records albums